Jerusalem thorn is a common name for several plants and may refer to:

 Paliurus spina-christi, a shrub native to the Eastern Hemisphere
 Parkinsonia aculeata, a shrub native to the Western Hemisphere